"Tired" is a song by Norwegian DJ and music producer Alan Walker, featuring Irish singer-songwriter Gavin James. The song was written by Mike Needle, Dan Bryer, Gavin James and Ollie Green, and was produced by Alan Walker, Gunnar Greve, Mood Melodies, Lars Kristian Rosness, Marcus Arnbekk, Fredrik Borch Olsen and Carl Hovind. It was released commercially for digital download on 19 May 2017. On 14 July 2017, Kygo released a remix of the song. In January 2018, Big Iyz remixed the song, credited to himself featuring Alan Walker and Gavin James.

Background 
Walker performed "Tired" in his live performances before the single's public release. On 15 May 2017, Alan Walker released an artwork video teaser for the single on social media, in which the single's cover art was revealed. A trailer was released on 17 May 2017, revealing more details of the music video for the song,
with the instrumental version of the song as background music.

On the occasion of the single release, Walker said: "I'm very excited to finally release 'Tired'. I feel it adds another dimension to my productions. Also, it is my first release with a male vocalist, and I'm very grateful to have Gavin James join me on this one. He has an amazing voice, has written an incredible song and I hope my fans will enjoy it as much as I do!" James added: "Delighted to be working with Alan on this track, he's such a talent, I love his sound and what he has done for the song! Can't wait for both of our audiences to hear it!"

Critical reception 
Matt Medved of Billboard regarded "Tired" as a song that "showcases Walker's signature melodic production within a more radio-friendly format than his previous outings."

Music video 
The artwork video of the song's cover and the trailer was released on May 15 and 17, respectively. The official music video was then released on May 19, 2017. The video begins as the solar flare named "Eleanor" is expected to impact Earth in 47 minutes, according to the music video trailer. The music video included flashbacks, some scenes of panicking crowds running around the streets, and newscast footages of random rioting and in terms of violence. In the final moments before the storm hits, a black-bloc-hooded man and a woman held their hands together as the countdown approaches, and as the solar storm hits Earth, the entire city and the world immediately blacks out due to the total loss of global electrical power and the music video ends.

Chronologically, a sequel of "Tired", All Falls Down was released that same year on October 26 and it shows the aftermath of the "Solar Storm Eleanor", about hundreds of years after the storm's impact.

As of March 10, 2020, "Tired" has amassed 128 million views and 1.3 million likes.

Track listing

Credits and personnel 
Credits adapted from Tidal.

 Alan Walker, Marcus Arnbekk, Lars Kristian Rosness, Fredrik Borch Olsen, Mood Melodies – composer, producer
 Gavin James, Mike Needle, Dan Bryer, Oliver Green – composer
 Gunnar Greve – composer, producer, executive producer
 Carl Hovind – producer
 Miles Walker – mixing engineer
 Björn Engelmann – mastering engineer
 Eirik Næss – guitarist
 Andre Viervoll – organist

Charts

Weekly charts

Year-end charts

Certifications

Release history

References

External links 
 

2017 singles
2017 songs
Alan Walker (music producer) songs
Songs written by Alan Walker (music producer)
Songs written by Gunnar Greve
Songs written by Mood Melodies
Future bass songs
Songs written by Dan Bryer
Songs written by Mike Needle
Songs written by Ollie Green (record producer)